Kirill Vladimirovich Kombarov (born 22 January 1987) is a Russian football official and a former player who played as a right-back. He is director of sports with FC Arsenal-2 Tula. He is an identical twin brother of Dmitri Kombarov.

Career 
Kirill started playing football at the age of 4. In 1993, Kirill and his brother Dmitri joined the Spartak Moscow football academy. After a conflict with the school coaches, the brothers left Spartak and joined the Dynamo Moscow academy.

Kirill made his first appearance for the main squad of Dynamo on 20 September 2006 in a Russian Cup game against Spartak Nizhny Novgorod.

In August 2010, the Kombarov brothers left Dynamo Moscow for their city rivals Spartak Moscow where they started their football education.

Career statistics

Club

Notes

References

1987 births
Living people
Russian footballers
Association football midfielders
Association football defenders
Russia under-21 international footballers
Russia national football B team footballers
FC Dynamo Moscow players
Footballers from Moscow
Russian twins
Russian Premier League players
FC Spartak Moscow players
FC Torpedo Moscow players
FC Tom Tomsk players
FC Arsenal Tula players
Twin sportspeople
FC Spartak-2 Moscow players